Australothele is a genus of Australian spiders in the family Euagridae. It was first described by Robert Raven in 1984.

Species
 it contains seven species:
Australothele bicuspidata Raven, 1984 – Australia (New South Wales)
Australothele jamiesoni Raven, 1984 – Australia (Queensland, New South Wales)
Australothele maculata Raven, 1984 (type) – Australia (Queensland)
Australothele magna Raven, 1984 – Australia (Queensland)
Australothele montana Raven, 1984 – Australia (New South Wales)
Australothele nambucca Raven, 1984 – Australia (New South Wales)
Australothele nothofagi Raven, 1984 – Australia (Queensland, New South Wales)

References

Euagridae
Mygalomorphae genera
Spiders of Australia